Rohrbach an der Gölsen is a town in the district of Lilienfeld in the Austrian state of Lower Austria.

Geography
Rohrbach an der Gölsen lies in the Mostviertel in Lower Austria. About 41.27 percent of the municipality is forested.

References

Cities and towns in Lilienfeld District